On Grace and Dignity (Über Anmut und Würde) is an influential philosophical essay published by Friedrich Schiller in the journal Neue Thalia in mid June 1793. It is his first major support for the philosophy of Immanuel Kant, critically assessing the treatments of ethics and aesthetics in Kant's Critique of Judgment.

In it, in view of man's dual nature as a rational and emotional being, Schiller explained human beauty in terms of Grace (Anmut) and Dignity (Würde). His emphatic answer to this was a Kantian dualism reconciling the physical and spiritual-rational nature in man, in a synthesis seen in  'beautiful souls' (Schöne Seelen) in which duty and nature harmonised. It thus paved the way for Schiller's philosophical and aesthetic masterwork On the Aesthetic Education of Man.

References

Philosophy essays
Works by Friedrich Schiller
Works originally published in German magazines
Works originally published in literary magazines
1793 documents